Earnest Wilson  is an American football coach. He is the head coach for the Arkansas Attack of the newly-formed Major League Football. Wilson served as the head football coach at Savannah State University in Savannah, Georgia from 2013 to 2015, Elizabeth City State University in Elizabeth City, North Carolina from 2016 to 2017, and Defiance College in Defiance, Ohio for one season, in 2021.

Coaching career
Wilson began his coaching career 1990 at Allegheny College. The 1990 Allegheny Gators football team won the NCAA Division III Football Championship

In May 2022, Wilson stepped down as the head coach at Defiance College. Shortly after his departure from Defiance was reported, Wilson was confirmed to be a head coach for Major League Football in their 2022 season.

Head coaching record

College

References

External links
 Defiance profile
 Savannah State profile

Year of birth missing (living people)
Living people
Alabama A&M Bulldogs football coaches
Allegheny Gators football coaches
Benedict Tigers football coaches
Defiance Yellow Jackets football coaches
Elizabeth City State Vikings football coaches
Hampton Pirates football coaches
Jackson State Tigers football coaches
Maine Black Bears football coaches
New Mexico State Aggies football coaches
Oberlin Yeomen football coaches
Penn State Nittany Lions football coaches
Savannah State Tigers football coaches
Texas Tech Red Raiders football players
African-American coaches of American football
African-American players of American football
21st-century African-American people